Blakea parvifolia is a species of plant in the family Melastomataceae. It is found in Panama and Peru.

References

parvifolia
Data deficient plants
Flora of Panama
Flora of Peru
Taxonomy articles created by Polbot
Taxobox binomials not recognized by IUCN